Presidential elections were held in Senegal on 27 February 2000, with a second round taking place on 19 March after no candidate won over 50% of votes in the first round. Although incumbent President Abdou Diouf of the Socialist Party won the most votes in the first round, he was defeated by long-term opposition leader Abdoulaye Wade of the Senegalese Democratic Party in the second round, marking the first time that the Socialist Party and its predecessors had lost power since independence. Voter turnout was 62.2% in the first round and 60.8% in the second.

Results

References

Further reading

Senegal
Presidential elections in Senegal
2000 in Senegal